Thomas A. Manning was a member of the Wisconsin State Assembly.

Biography
Manning was born on October 15, 1886 in Milwaukee, Wisconsin. He would later captain the Marquette Golden Avalanche football team. Manning was a member of the Knights of Columbus. He died in Milwaukee on April 4, 1944. A tribute to him was read by the Assembly.

Political career
Manning was a member of the Assembly from 1913 to 1915. Additionally, he was a Milwaukee alderman from 1914 to 1916. He was a candidate for city attorney in 1922 and for civil judge in 1933.

References

Members of the Wisconsin State Assembly
Wisconsin city council members
Wisconsin state court judges
Players of American football from Milwaukee
Marquette Golden Avalanche football players
Marquette University Law School alumni
American Roman Catholics
Wisconsin lawyers
1886 births
1944 deaths
20th-century American judges
20th-century American politicians
20th-century American lawyers